Qeqertat is a small village in the Qaanaaq area of the Avannaata municipality, in northern Greenland. The village had 23 inhabitants in 2020. It is the most northern community in the world, not big enough to be considered a town.

Population 
The population of Qeqertat has been stable in the last two decades. After registering a decline in the 90's, the population grew to 30 in 2010, before declining again to 23 in 2019.

References

Further reading

 Fredskild, Bent. The Holocene Vegetational Development of Tugtuligssuaq and Qeqertat, Northwest Greenland. Meddelelser om Grønland, 14. Copenhagen: Commission for Scientific Research in Greenland, 1985. 

Populated places in Greenland
Populated places of Arctic Greenland